Visible Music College is a private Christian music school, with its main campus in Memphis, Tennessee and teaching sites in the Chicago, Dallas, and Atascadero, California areas. 

Visible Music College is authorized for operation as a post-secondary educational institution by the Tennessee Higher Education Commission, offering four and three-year Bachelor's degrees, three-year Master's degrees and a one-year certificate program. It is accredited by the Transnational Association of Christian Colleges and Schools (TRACS).

The small size of the school has not prevented controversy, including student-led lawsuits regarding intellectual property theft and staff attempts to stifle rape allegations.

History

Visible School was created in early 2000, after Dr. Ken Steorts, founding guitarist of the Christian rock band Skillet, had left the band to travel to Coventry, England to view a Christian music college resembling the idea of Visible School. After visiting the Nexus Academy of Music, he began Visible Community School of Music and Worship Arts as a ministry of Grace Covenant Church, also located in Memphis, Tennessee. The 2000–2001 school year began with twenty-one students and four full-time faculty.

During the 2001–2002 school year, the school formally separated from Grace Covenant Church, now Lifelink Church, and became an incorporated and authorized school of higher education in the state of Tennessee. In August 2002, the school grew to sixty-nine first and second year students, and partnered with Victory University (formerly Crichton College) for accredited coursework through the Southern Association of Colleges and Schools (SACS). The school also formalized relations with Days Inn, Lakeland, Tennessee for dormitory housing, creating a campus for the institution. The faculty increased to twelve and programs increased to match student and faculty growth.

In late 2003, Visible School grew to seventy-nine first and second-year students, twenty faculty members, and added a school board. Two years later, the school ended its relationship with Crichton College (Now Victory University). Students at Visible School were now able to receive loans and direct aid through United States Department of Education and Title IV aid. However, the Department of Education denied Visible School the ability to obtain aid for its students due. Expected enrollment of 100 became 65, with the course load of 35 students paying in cash and unsecured loans. Financially the budget shrank, and many of the faculty took part-time hours and pay cuts to balance.

In the late 2005 and early 2006, a single donor stepped up to cover the costs of running the school for the remainder of the 2005–2006 academic year. Visible School was able to hire a full-time librarian and continue offering full course loads to students as a result of the TRACS accreditation process. In 2006 the school's enrollment grew to 65 full-time students.

In early 2007, the student body number rose again and the school focused on international programs and recording projects such as Visible Media Group, an artist development facet of Visible School, and Visible Music Week; a national and international week-long music training program. Two years later, TRACS accredited the institution.

The school moved the campus into Downtown Memphis, Tennessee, in 2011 after receiving a 3 million-dollar matching grant. That same year, Visible School announced its official name change to Visible Music College and launched Madison Line Records.

Campuses 
Visible Music College has three campus locations in three different cities: Memphis, Chicago and Dallas.

Memphis
Memphis is the home to the flagship campus, a 45,200-square-foot building former bank headquarters.  Students can gain access to the campus using the downtown trolley line. The original building used to be the C&I Bank Building that was salvaged and is now used for classrooms, offices, meeting rooms and personal practices spaces. The concrete structures were preserved, and now features a street level urban park. 

The main campus also offers student housing with 63 residential units. The average annual housing cost is $6,000 per year.

Chicago
The second campus is located less than 30 miles from Downtown Chicago in Lansing, Illinois.

Dallas
The third campus is located in North Central Dallas near Christ Fellowship Church in McKinney, Texas.

Controversy
In 2019 Abraham Best, a former student of Visible Music College, claimed his professor Dr. John Johnson violated copyright law and stole his intellectual property. The student reported the situation to multiple staff at the college and was requested to keep it quiet, according to his complaint filed in court. After continuing to pursue the issue, the student Abraham Best was expelled from the college. 

In 2022 a former student, Mara Louk, reported that Visible administrators had failed to investigate an alleged sexual assault perpetrated by a male student and filed a United States Department of Education complaint regarding egregious misconduct by college administrators. Instead of performing a Title IX investigation regarding the assault, staff opened an investigation into the alleged victim for violating campus behavior contracts and engaging in premarital sex. Later, Louk was offered a "Pastoral Care Contract" that stipulated that she "...would be required to finish her degree online, barred from campus and prohibited from talking to other students about her alleged assault." Louk refused the agreement, negotiations failed, and Visible expelled Louk.

Two Department of Education investigations into Title IX discrimination, and failures to abide by Clery Act provisions are currently pending.

References

External links
 

Christian universities and colleges in the United States
Educational institutions established in 2000
Universities and colleges in Memphis, Tennessee
2000 establishments in Tennessee